Claude-Henri is a French masculine given name, and may refer to:

 Claude-Henri Belgrand de Vaubois (1748–1839), a French general
 Claude-Henri de Fusée de Voisenon (1708–1775), a French dramatist and writer
 Claude-Henri Gorceix (1842–1919), a French mineralogist
 Claude-Henri Grignon (1894–1976), a Canadian novelist, journalist and politician
 Claude-Henri Plantier (1813–1875), a French theologian
 Claude-Henri Watelet (1718–1786), a French printmaker

Compound given names
French masculine given names